The 2011 Colorado Buffaloes football team represented the University of Colorado at Boulder in the 2011 NCAA Division I FBS football season. Led by first-year head coach and alumnus Jon Embree, the Buffaloes played their home games on-campus at Folsom Field in Boulder and were first-year members of the newly expanded Pac-12 Conference. They finished with a record of 3–10, 2–7 in Pac-12 play, in a tie for last place in the South Division.

Preseason

Recruiting
National Signing Day was on February 2, 2011 and Colorado signed high school athletes from around the country.

Schedule

Game summaries

Hawaii

Colorado lost their 18th consecutive road game with their 34–17 loss to Hawaii on September 3 in Jon Embree's debut as Colorado head coach. The Buffaloes' last road win came on October 27, 2007 against Texas Tech. Hawaii quarterback Bryant Moniz ran for a career-best 121 yards and three touchdowns and threw for one touchdown and 20 completions on 33 attempts. Although Hawaii led most of the evening, Colorado made it interesting at the start of the fourth quarter, and took advantage of a fumble by Moniz; the Buffaloes cut the lead to 24–17 with a 34-yard field goal by placekicker Will Oliver. That was the last Colorado score, as Hawaii scored the game's last 10 points to secure the win.

California

Although both teams are members of the Pac-12, this game counted as a non-conference game in the standings as this game was scheduled before Colorado joined the Pac-12.

Things started off rough for Cal, but after a failure at 4th and goal for Colorado and later a field goal, Cal capitalized on the momentum shift and raced out to a 16–6 lead at halftime. Cal continue to score, but the Buffaloes rebounded strongly by outgaining Cal offensively and later tied the game. In overtime, Colorado was held to a field goal and Zach Maynard later connected to Keenan Allen for a game-winning touchdown.

Colorado State

Ohio State

Washington State

Stanford

Washington

Oregon

Notes: Darragh O'Neill punts four balls inside the five yard-line, one causing the Ducks to retreat in their end zone from the momentum of the punt, and them being tackled forcing a safety, the Buffaloes' only score.

Arizona State

USC

Arizona

    
    
    
    
    
    
    
    
    
    
    
    

Colorado recorded their first ever Pac-12 win and avoided the first winless season in Folsom Field history.

UCLA

First Quarter scoring: UCLA – Shaqell Evans 54-yard pass from Kevin Prince (Tyler Gonzalez kick); UCLA – Johnathan Franklin 14-yard run (Gonzalez kick); UCLA – Joseph Fauria 5-yard pass from Prince (Gonzalez kick) 
 
Second Quarter scoring: CU – Toney Clemons 20-yard pass from Tyler Hansen ( Will Oliver kick failed)

Third Quarter scoring: UCLA – Gonzalez 22-yard field goal

Fourth Quarter scoring: UCLA – Fauria 15-yard pass from Prince (Gonzalez kick); UCLA – Nelson Rosario 11-yard pass from Prince (Gonzalez kick); UCLA – Malcolm Jones 1-yard run (Gonzalez kick)

Utah

Roster

References

Colorado
Colorado Buffaloes football seasons
Colorado Buffaloes football